Karl Johnson (born 1 March 1948) is a Welsh actor, who has worked on stage, film and television. His notable roles to date include the title role in Derek Jarman's 1993 film Wittgenstein, and those of Cato the Younger in the television drama series Rome and of Twister Turrill in the BBC costume drama Lark Rise to Candleford.

Filmography

Film

 Jubilee (1978) - Sphinx
 The Tempest (1979) - Ariel, an airy spirit
 Prick Up Your Ears (1987) - Douglas Orton
 A Prayer for the Dying (1987) - Fitzgerald
 Close My Eyes (1991) - Colin
 Let Him Have It (1991) - Parris
 Wittgenstein (1993) - Ludwig Wittgenstein
 Love Is the Devil: Study for a Portrait of Francis Bacon (1998) - John Deakin
 Tomorrow La Scala (2002) - Sydney
 Pure (2002) - Grandad
 Frozen (2005) - Coastguard Bill
 Heidi (2005) - Old Man
 The Illusionist (2006) - Doctor / Old Man
 Copying Beethoven (2006) - Stefan Holtz
 Four Last Songs (2007) - Erico
 Hot Fuzz (2007) - PC Bob Walker
 The Edge of Love (2008) - Dai Fred (uncredited)
 Is Anybody There? (2008) - Arthur (uncredited)
 I Know You Know (2008) - Ernie
 Third Star (2010) - Ticket Seller
 Frankenstein (2011) - de Lacey
 The Pier (2011) - Larry McCarthy
 The Deep Blue Sea (2011) - Mr Miller
 Good Vibrations (2012) - George
 The Sea (2013) - Blunden
 Mr Turner (2014) - Mr Booth
 Hamlet (2015) - Ghost of Hamlet's Father / Gravedigger
 The Carer (2016) - Joseph
 Kaleidoscope (2016) - John
 Winter Thaw (2016) - Stepanovich
 The Death of Stalin (2017) - Dr. Lukomsky
 Peterloo (2018) - Lord Sidmouth, the Home Secretary
 King Lear (2018) - The Fool
 Dream Horse (2020) - Kerby

Television

 Rainbow (1973–1974) - Karl, part of the music trio
 Sons and Lovers (1981) - Paul Morel
 A Tale of Two Cities (1989) - Barsad
 Rules of Engagement (1989 TV Series) - Dave Gillespie
 The Bill (1989–2004) - Jon Jennings / Len Rogers / Geoff Hallwood / D.I. Osborne
 Agatha Christie's Poirot (1993, TV Series, 1 episode: Jewel Robbery at the Grand Metropolitan) - Saunders
 Catherine the Great (1995, TV Movie) - Sheshkovsky
 An Independent Man (1995) - Bill Rutherford
 The Temptation of Franz Schubert (1997, TV Movie) - Doctor
 Wing and a Prayer (1997)
 Vanity Fair (1998) - Major Loder
 David Copperfield (1999) - Tungay
 Without Motive (2000–2001) - Robert Jackson
 Born and Bred (2003) - Alec Rossendale
 The Mayor of Casterbridge (2003, TV Movie) - Fall
 When I'm 64 (2004, TV Movie) - Billy
 Dalziel and Pascoe: Soft Touch (2004) - Stevie Earle
 Midsomer Murders (2005) - Derek Lockwood
 Rome (2005–2007) - Porcius Cato
 The Chatterley Affair (2006, TV Movie) - Mr. Justice Byrne
 Nostradamus (2006, TV Movie)
 New Tricks (2006) - Gary Kendall
 Ancient Rome: The Rise and Fall of an Empire (2006) - Marcellus
 As You Like It (2006)
 Lark Rise to Candleford (2008–2011) - Twister Turrill
 Small Island (2009) - Arthur Bligh
 Merlin (2010) - Taliesin
 Call the Midwife (2013) - Mr. Masterson
 Why We Went to War (2015)
 Lovesick (2016) - Richard
 Mum (2016–2019) - Reg
 King Lear (2018, TV Movie) - Fool
 Ray's DazeSelected stage career
 The Seafarer, as James 'Sharky' Harkin, National Theatre, London
 Tales From The Vienna Woods, National Theatre, London
 Scenes from the Big Picture, National Theatre, London
 Hamlet, National Theatre, London
 The Walls, National Theatre, London
 Cardiff East, National Theatre, London
 The Ends of the Earth, National Theatre, London
 Machine Wreckers, National Theatre, London
 The Shape of The Table, National Theatre, London
 Black Snow, National Theatre, London
 Golden Boy, National Theatre, London
 The Resistible Rise of Arturo Ui, National Theatre, London
 The Sea, National Theatre, London
 Uncle Vanya, National Theatre, London
 Don Quixote, National Theatre, London
 A Midsummer Night's Dream, National Theatre, London
 The Fawn, National Theatre, London
 Glengarry Glen Ross, National Theatre, London
 Wild Honey, National Theatre, London
 The Rivals, National Theatre, London
 The Mysteries, National Theatre, London
 Animal Farm, National Theatre, London
 Almost Nothing/At The Table, Royal Court Theatre, London
 Not Not Not Not Not Enough Oxygen, Royal Court Theatre, London
 This Is A Chair, Royal Court Theatre, London
 The Night Heron, Royal Court Theatre, London
 Boy Gets Girl, Royal Court Theatre, London
 The Weir, Royal Court Theatre, London
 Been So Long, Royal Court Theatre, London
 Just a Little Less Than Normal, Royal Court Theatre, London
 Sudlow's Dawn, Royal Court Theatre, London
 Irish Eyes and English Tears, Royal Court Theatre, London
 In The Company of Men, Royal Shakespeare Company, Stratford
 TV Times, Royal Shakespeare Company, Stratford
 Knight of the Burning Pestle, Royal Shakespeare Company, Stratford
 Amadeus, Peter Hall Company
 The Country Wife, Centreline Productions
 The Last Yankee, Leicester Haymarket
 Woyzeck, Foco Novo at Lyric Hammersmith
 War Crimes, ICA
 The Dresser, Leatherhead
 Hedda Gabler, Yvonne Arnaud Guildford
 Much Ado About Nothing, Open Air Theatre, Regent's Park
 As You Like It, Old Vic
 Vieux Carre, West End
 Frankenstein, National Theatre, London
 Barking in Essex'', Wyndham's Theatre

References

External links

1948 births
Living people
Welsh male film actors
Welsh male stage actors
Welsh male television actors
21st-century Welsh male actors
20th-century Welsh male actors